Soler may refer to:

 Soler Township, Roseau County, Minnesota
 Soler (band), Hong Kong based rock band
 Soler (grape), French wine grape, also known as Peloursin

People with the surname Soler
 Alay Soler (born 1979), Cuban baseball player for the New York Mets
 Alexandra Soler (born 1983), French artistic gymnast
 Álvaro Soler (born 1991), Spanish singer-songwriter
 Amalia Domingo Soler (1835–1909), Spanish writer
 Andrés Soler (1898–1969), Mexican actor
 Angelino Soler (born 1939), Spanish professional road bicycle racer
 Antonio Soler (1729–1783), Spanish baroque/classical era composer usually known as Padre ('Father') Antonio Soler
 Carlos Soler (footballer) (born 1997), Spanish footballer
 Domingo Soler (1901–1961), Mexican actor
 Fernando Soler (1896–1979), Mexican film actor and film director
 Francesc Fàbregas Soler (born 1987), Spanish footballer
 Francisco Gabilondo Soler (1907–1990), also known as Cri-Cri, Mexican composer and performer of children songs
 Gérard Soler (born 1954), French-Moroccan footballer
 Giselle Soler, Argentinian artistic roller skater
 Jorge Soler (born 1992), Cuban baseball player
 Jorge Soler (gymnast), Argentine gymnast
 Juan Soler (born 1966), Argentine-Mexican actor
 Julián Soler (1907–1977), Mexican actor and film director
 Marc Soler (born 1993), Spanish cyclist
 Mariano Soler (1846–1908), Uruguayan cleric and theologian
 Mauricio Soler (born 1983), Colombian professional road bicycle racer
 Miguel Estanislao Soler (1783–1849), Argentine general
 Miquel Soler (born 1965), Spanish football player and coach
 Pastora Soler, stage name of Pilar Sánchez Luque (born 1978), Spanish singer
 Placido Soler Bordas (1903–1964), Spanish chess player
 Rebecca Soler, American voice actress
 Sílvia Soler
 Toti Soler, stage name of Jordi Soler i Galí (born 1949), Spanish guitarist, singer and composer
 Vicente Martín y Soler (1754–1806), Spanish composer of opera and ballet
 Yolanda Soler (born 1972), Spanish judoka

See also
Soler., taxonomic author abbreviation of Hans Solereder (1860–1920), German botanist
Solar (disambiguation)

Catalan-language surnames